Ammotretis is a genus of righteye flounders native to the coastal waters off southern Australia.

Species
There are currently five recognized species in this genus:
 Ammotretis brevipinnis Norman, 1926 (Shortfin flounder)
 Ammotretis elongatus McCulloch, 1914 (Elongate flounder)
 Ammotretis lituratus (J. Richardson, 1844) (Tudor's flounder)
 Ammotretis macrolepis McCulloch, 1914
 Ammotretis rostratus Günther, 1862 (Longsnout flounder)

References 

Pleuronectidae
Taxa named by Albert Günther
Marine fish genera